Gianni Corelli (30 December 1936 – 11 May 2008) was an Italian football striker and later manager.

References

1936 births
2008 deaths
Sportspeople from Ferrara
Italian footballers
S.P.A.L. players
Spezia Calcio players
S.S.C. Napoli players
Mantova 1911 players
Ternana Calcio players
A.S.D. Città di Foligno 1928 players
Serie A players
Association football forwards
Italian football managers
Spezia Calcio managers
Mantova 1911 managers
F.C. Crotone managers
Parma Calcio 1913 managers
Footballers from Emilia-Romagna